Western Washington University (WWU or Western) is a public university in Bellingham, Washington. The northernmost university in the contiguous United States, WWU was founded in 1893 as the state-funded New Whatcom Normal School, succeeding a private school of teaching for women founded in 1886. In 1977, the university adopted its present name.

WWU offers a variety of bachelor's and master's degrees. In 2019, there were 16,142 students, 15,240 of whom were undergraduate students, and 664 full time faculty. Its athletic teams are known as the Vikings, which compete in division II of the National Collegiate Athletic Association.

The main campus is located on 215 acres in Bellingham, Washington. Branch campuses are located in Anacortes and Lakewood, Washington. The university is accredited by the Northwest Commission on Colleges and Universities. Additional accreditation is held by individual colleges.

History

Western was established as the Northwest Normal School, a teachers' school predominantly for women although men also enrolled, by Phoebe Judson in Lynden, Washington, in 1886. Eventually the school moved to Bellingham (then "New Whatcom"), and through the efforts of William R. Moultray and George Judson (Phoebe's son). Governor John McGraw signed legislation establishing the New Whatcom Normal School on February 24, 1893. In November 1895, construction began on a permanent school building, now known as Old Main, the current administration building. Designed by prominent Seattle architects Warren Skillings & James Corner, it was completed by early 1897 but could not be opened to students until funds could be secured to install heating, lighting, and to do general grounds maintenance, which were not included in the original contract. The first official class entered in 1899, composed of 88 students.

The institution that is now Western Washington University underwent several name changes. In 1901, the school's name was changed to State Normal School at Whatcom to reflect New Whatcom's name change. In 1904, the name was changed to Washington State Normal School at Bellingham when the townships of Whatcom and Fairhaven joined, and again in 1937, to Western Washington College of Education when it became a four-year college. Twenty-four years later it became Western Washington State College and finally, in 1977, the institution gained university status and changed to its present name.

The 1960s was a period of especially rapid growth for Western, as its enrollment increased from 3,000 students to over 10,000 during the decade. Also during this time, the Fairhaven College of Interdisciplinary Studies was founded (1967), with non-traditional education methods that would serve as a model for The Evergreen State College in Olympia, Washington. Two years later, the Huxley College of the Environment, the nation's first dedicated environmental science college, was founded, continuing Western's trend toward "cluster" colleges. That same year, on a spring afternoon, students gained headlines by blocking Interstate 5 to protest the Vietnam War. Also in 1969, the College of Ethnic Studies was established; however, after being met with significant resistance, it was dismantled in 1975.

Since this period, the College of Arts and Sciences was founded (1973) and divided into the College of Humanities & Social Sciences and the College of Science & Engineering (2003); the College of Fine and Performing Arts was formed from several art departments (1975); and the College of Business and Economics was established (1976).

Today, WWU has a student body that currently consists of over 16,000 students. The university is the third largest in Washington after Washington State University and the University of Washington.

Campus

WWU is located in Bellingham, a city of about 90,000 people, overlooking Bellingham Bay and many of the San Juan Islands. The university is located close to Interstate 5.

Campus facilities include an electronic music studio, an air pollution lab, a motor vehicle research lab, a marine research lab, a wind tunnel, an electron microscope, and a neutron generator lab. Western's Vehicle Research Institute has led Automobile Magazine to describe Western as "very possibly the best school in the country for total car design." Western also has off-campus facilities at Shannon Point Marine Center in Anacortes, Washington; Lakewood, a  student-university facility at nearby Lake Whatcom; and Whatcom County property used for environmental and aquatic analyses.

Public sculpture collection

WWU's prized collection of outdoor and indoor public art sculptures is a major presence on its campus. The collection, funded by the Washington State Arts Commission, the National Endowment for the Arts, and private donations, includes 36 works: Founded in 1960, the collection includes large-scale works by James FitzGerald, Isamu Noguchi, Robert Morris, Mark di Suvero, Anthony Caro, Nancy Holt, Beverly Pepper, Richard Serra, Donald Judd and Bruce Nauman, among others.

Academics

Academic organization
Western offers bachelor's degrees and the degrees of Master of Arts, Master of Science, Master of Education, Master of Arts in Teaching, Master of Business Administration, Master of Professional Accounting, Master of Music and Doctor of Audiology. The university is composed of the following colleges and their respective programs:

Accreditation
The university is accredited by the Northwest Commission on Colleges and Universities; National Association of Schools of Music; National Recreation and Parks Association; American Speech and Hearing Association; National Council for Accreditation of Teacher Education; Computing Sciences Accreditation Board; Accreditation Board for Engineering and Technology; American Chemical Society; Association to Advance Collegiate Schools of Business; and the Council for Accreditation of Counseling and Related Educational Programs. Planning Accreditation Board

Honors
The undergraduate honors program offers merit scholarships worth up to $5,000. These scholarships are awarded to successful applicants to the honors program. No separate application is necessary. High-achieving freshmen from colleges in other western states can enroll at Western at a reduced tuition level that is equivalent to a $30,000 four-year scholarship.

Rankings
In 2022-23, US News ranked Western Washington University as the top public master's granting university in the Pacific Northwest, while placing 14th overall in the West (both public and private). Western was one of only two public schools ranked among the top 25 Master's-Granting Universities (West) category. The universities found in this ranking are schools that lack doctoral programs but still retain master's programs. It has a 72% acceptance rate.

Western Washington University ranked first among the top medium-sized colleges and universities with alumni serving as Peace Corps volunteers in 2013 and 2014.

Notable degree programs
The Philosophical Gourmet Report mentions Western as having one of the nation's best philosophy departments among colleges and universities that offer only a B.A. in the discipline. Western was among only seven public universities so honored.
The Center for Canadian American Studies at Western Washington University is one of only two U.S. Department of Education designated National Resource Centers for the study of Canada in the United States.

Research institutes and laboratories

College of Business and Economics
Center for Economics and Business Research
Center for Economic & Financial Education
Center for Excellence in Management Education
Center for International Business
Small Business Development Center
Center for Operations Research and Management Sciences
Small Business Development Center
Manufacturing Supply Chain Management

College of Humanities and Social Sciences
Border Policy Research Institute
Center for Cross-Cultural Research
Center for Pacific Northwest Studies
Center for Performance Excellence
Critical Junctures Institute
Demographics Research Laboratory
Institute for Literary Sciences
Karen W. Morse Institute of Leadership

College of Science and Engineering
Advanced Material Science and Engineering Center
Internet Studies Center
Vehicle Research Institute

College of the Environment
Institute for Watershed Studies
Institute for Spatial Information and Analysis
Institute of Environmental Toxicology
The Resilience Institute

Multi-College
Center for Instructional Innovation and Assessment
Shannon Point Marine Center
BRAIN Behavioral Neuroscience program
Institute for Energy Studies
Center for Continuing Education and Rehabilitation (with University of Washington)
Center for Education Data and Research (with University of Washington)

Student publications 
The Front (previously The Western Front) is the official student newspaper of WWU. The publication is staffed by students and overseen by a faculty advisor from the journalism department. The first issue was published in 1967. The paper was called "The Western Front" until June 2021 when it was changed to "The Front". In 2016, the publication was selected as the winner for Best All-Around Non-Daily Newspaper in the Society of Professional Journalists Region 10 Mark of Excellence Awards.

Klipsun Magazine is a quarterly student magazine that focuses on immersive reporting techniques and narrative storytelling.

The Planet is a quarterly environmental magazine created by students through the College of the Environment at WWU.

Occam's Razor is an annual student-run academic journal that publishes outstanding undergraduate research across all disciplines.

Athletics

WWU is an official member of NCAA Division II, having joined in September 1998. In 2011–12, approximately 350 students are participating in 15 varsity sports at Western, six for men and nine for women. In 2010–11, WWU placed seventh among 310 NCAA Division II schools in the Sports Director's Cup national all-sports standings, the second-highest finish in school history. The Vikings were sixth in 2009–2010 and tenth in 2008–2009. WWU has had eight straight Top 50 finishes and been among the Top 100 in each of its first 13 seasons as an NCAA II member.

In 2010–11, Western won its third straight and seventh overall Great Northwest Athletic Conference All-Sports championship, taking league titles in volleyball, men's golf and women's golf, and the regular-season crown in women's basketball. The Vikings, who won the Northwest Collegiate Rowing Conference championship, placed second in men's and women's cross country, men's and women's outdoor track, men's indoor track and softball.

The Vikings have won an NAIA national championship in softball (1998) and NCAA Division II national championships in women's rowing (2005, 2006, 2007, 2008, 2009, 2010, 2011, 2017), men's basketball (2012) and women's soccer (2016). WWU athletes have also won individual national championships in track and field.

Varsity sports
The Vikings field varsity teams for men and women in cross country, soccer, golf, basketball, and track & field.  Women's teams compete in volleyball, softball, and rowing. Between 1903 and 2008 WWU fielded a football team but folded it in hopes of saving money to keep other WWU teams competitive.

Club sports
In addition to its varsity sports programs, WWU also has a number of student-run club sports teams:
Baseball
Rowing (Men's)
Climbing
Cycling
Equestrian
Fencing
Figure Skating
Golf
Hockey
Judo
Lacrosse (Men's and Women's)
Rugby (Men's and Women's)
Sailing
Swimming
Tennis
Ultimate (Men's and Women's)
Volleyball (Men's and Women's)
Wakeboarding
Water Polo (Men's and Women's)
Water Skiing
Wrestling

Students
A total of 16,121 students were in attendance at Western Washington University in the 2018–19 academic year. 92 percent of students are under 25 years of age, and 84 percent are from Washington State.

Many students at Western Washington University participate in organized student government. The Associated Students of Western Washington University (ASWWU) is "an organization designed and run by Western students, the Associated Students (AS) seeks to ensure a fulfilling college and academic experience for all university students through the many services, facilities and programs it offers." Within ASWWU, there are five main areas of focus: clubs, activities, programs, facilities & services, and governance.

The AS aims to provide "funding, space and services" to students "uniting around common interests." The AS staff assist student development of clubs and provide advising, "continuity, referral and record keeping" throughout the entire process. Currently there are over two hundred student clubs in the following categories: Arts and Music, Cultural, Political, Special Interest, Gaming, Social Issues, Departmental, Limited Membership, Service, Religious, and Recreational.

In the 2021–22 school year, the music department has a new course for music education majors called K-12 Classroom Accompanying Pedagogy (MUS 262.)  A new course in Music and Sustainability (MUS 397E) is available to all Western students.

Students who desire to set up a table in Red Square to promote their club need to sign up for a space thru the university. A blue board at the West side of Red Square has general university policy on freedom of speech and also guidelines for using chalk on the bricks.

There is a livestream of Red Square filmed from the top of Bond Hall. 

KUGS radio station accepts albums from students to air. KUGS also has a large library of vinyls that can be listened to in the studio.

People

Notable faculty
James Bertolino, English
Andy Bunn, Environmental Science
Jeff Carroll, Psychology
Catherine T. Montgomery, Education
Suzanne Paola, English
Richard Purtill, Philosophy (emeritus)
Ada Swineford, Geologist
Edward Vajda, Modern & Classical Languages
Christopher Wise, English

Notable alumni
Robert Angel, creator of Pictionary
Richard Barlow, intelligence analyst
Carrie Brownstein, member of the band Sleater-Kinney, star and co-creator of comedy television series Portlandia.
Ryan Couture (2004), professional Mixed Martial Artist formerly competing in the UFC, and son of former UFC Heavyweight Champion Randy Couture
Sarah Crouch, long-distance runner
Mike Duncan (2002), podcaster and author best known for The History of Rome and Revolutions
Darril Fosty (1992), author and documentarian
Ben Gibbard (1998), lead vocalist and guitarist of Death Cab for Cutie and The Postal Service
Agnes Martin, minimalist artist
TJ Martin, Oscar winner of Best Feature Documentary for Undefeated, 2012
Douglas Massey (1974), sociologist working as a professor at Princeton University and an adjunct professor at the University of Pennsylvania
Harrison Mills and Clayton Knight (2012), creators of electronic dance duo ODESZA
Heather Purser, Seattle LGBT rights activist and Native American advocate
Hiro Yamamoto, founding member and bassist of the rock band Soundgarden
Ijeoma Oluo, author and writer
William Dietrich, author and journalist 
Julie Larson-Green, former CXO of Office Experience Organization at Microsoft
Ralph Munro, former Secretary of State of Washington
Elizabeth Peratrovich, civil rights activist who worked for equality on behalf of Alaska Natives
Jesse Moore, White House Associate Director of Public Engagement and Speechwriter to President Barack Obama
Bob Robertson, voice of Washington State University Cougar Athletics for over 50 years
Heidi Grant Murphy, a Canadian-American operatic soprano
Erin Wall, a Canadian-American operatic soprano
Brooklyn Holton, community leader and activist in Wenatchee 
Gerald Nies, Chairman of Riverview Bancorp Board of Directors for 27 years
John Michael Greer, author and druid
Michael Farris, CEO of Alliance Defending Freedom, a public interest law firm committed to protecting religious liberty (www.adf.org)
Kelli Linville, former Mayor of Bellingham and Member of the Washington House of Representatives
Ben Dragavon, former American soccer player who is currently an assistant coach for Seattle Reign FC 
Larry Springer, Member of the Washington House of Representatives
Matt Overton, long snapper for the Los Angeles Chargers of the National Football League
Daulton Hommes, former professional basketball player for the New Orleans Pelicans of the National Basketball Association

See also
Northwest Film School

References

External links

Western Washington Athletics website

 
Educational institutions established in 1893
Universities and colleges in Bellingham, Washington
Universities and colleges accredited by the Northwest Commission on Colleges and Universities
Public universities and colleges in Washington (state)
1893 establishments in Washington (state)